The Vancouver Stealth are a lacrosse team based in Vancouver, British Columbia. The team plays in the National Lacrosse League (NLL). The 2015 season is the second season in Vancouver, though it will be the 16th in franchise history. They previously played in Everett, Washington, San Jose, and Albany, New York.

Regular season

Current standings

Game log

Roster

Transactions

Trades

Entry Draft
The 2014 NLL Entry Draft took place on September 22, 2014. The Stealth made the following selections:

See also
2015 NLL season

References

Vancouver
Vancouver Stealth seasons
Vancouver Stealth